A total of 112 fictional films are known to have been produced in the Dutch East Indies (modern day Indonesia) between 1926 and the colony's dissolution in 1949. The earliest motion pictures, imported from abroad, were shown in late 1900, and by the early 1920s imported serials and fictional films were being shown, often with localised names. Dutch companies were also producing documentary films about the Indies to be shown in the Netherlands. The first reports of fictional film production in the Indies date from 1923, although the work in question was not completed. The first locally produced film, Loetoeng Kasaroeng, was directed by L. Heuveldorp and released on 31 December 1926.

Between 1926 and 1933 numerous other local productions were released. Although Dutchmen like Heuveldorp and G. Krugers continued to be active in the industry, the majority of filmmakers and producers were ethnic Chinese. The Tan brothers (Khoen Yauw and Khoen Hian) and The Teng Chun were major producers during this period, while the Wong brothers (Nelson, Othniel, and Joshua) were among the more prominent directors. During the mid-1930s, production dropped as a result of the Great Depression. The release of Albert Balink's commercially and critically successful Terang Boelan (Full Moon) in 1937 led to renewed interest in filmmaking, and 1941 saw thirty locally produced films. This rate of production declined after the Japanese occupation beginning in early 1942, closing all but one film studio; this resulted in several films which had begun production in 1941 being released several years later. The majority of films produced during the occupation were short propaganda pieces. Following the Proclamation of Indonesian Independence in 1945 and during the ensuing revolution several films were made, by both pro-Dutch and pro-Indonesian backers; the Dutch formally recognised Indonesia's sovereignty on 27 December 1949, leaving the Dutch East Indies defunct.

Generally films produced in the Indies dealt with traditional stories or were adapted from existing works. The early films were silent, with Karnadi Anemer Bangkong (Karnadi the Frog Contractor; 1930) generally considered the first talkie; later films would be in Dutch, Malay, or an indigenous language. All were black-and-white.

According to the Indonesian film scholar Misbach Yusa Biran, the films released during this period could not be classified as truly Indonesian films as there was no sense of nationalism within them. The American visual anthropologist Karl G. Heider writes that all films from before 1950 are lost. However, JB Kristanto's Katalog Film Indonesia (Indonesian Film Catalogue) records several as having survived at Sinematek Indonesia's archives, and Biran writes that several Japanese propaganda films have survived at the Netherlands Government Information Service.


Pre-independence

Post-independence

See also 
 List of Indonesian films

Notes

References

Footnotes

Bibliography 

 
 
 
 
 
 
 
 
 
 
 
 
 
 
 
 
 
 
 
 
 
 
 
 
 
 
 
 
 
 
 
 
 
 
 
 
 
 
 
 
 
 
 
 
 
 
 
 
 
 
 
 
 
 
 
 
 
 
 
 
 
 
 
 
 
 
 
 
 
 
 
 
 
 
 
 
 
 
 
 
 
 
 
 
 
 
 
 
 
 
 
 
 
 
 
 
 
 
 
 
 
 
 
 
 
 
 
 
 
 
 
 
 
 
 

Dutch East Indies